The 61st Annual TV Week Logie Awards ceremony was held at The Star Gold Coast in Queensland and was broadcast live on the Nine Network. Public voting for the Most Popular Award categories ran from 4 to 31 March 2019, with the shortlist of nominees released on 26 May.

Each network is restricted in the number of personalities and programs they can submit for consideration in the publicly voted category, including up to 10 names in both the Most Popular Actor and Actress categories, 15 names for Most Popular Presenter, and 5 programs for Most Popular Drama. These restrictions on nominations often lead to controversy as being widely panned for the second consecutive year over those who are not listed in the voting form, and as a result, they are not eligible to be nominated for an award.

Nominees
Nominees were announced on 26 May 2019.

Gold Logie

Acting/Presenting

Most Popular Programs

Most Outstanding Programs

Changes to the ceremony
The 2019 ceremony saw the introduction of two new industry-voted awards: Most Outstanding Reality Program and Most Popular TV Commercial. The awards for Most Popular Panel or Current Affairs Program and Most Outstanding Entertainment Program also returned after being absent from the 2018 Logies.

Presenters
Tom Gleeson
Hamish Blake & Andy Lee
Waleed Aly
Tracy Grimshaw
Scott Tweedie
Julia Morris

Performers
Guy Sebastian — Before I Go, Battle Scars, Choir 
Jessica Mauboy — Little Things 
Delta Goodrem — Greatest Hits Medley: Sitting On Top Of The World, Wings, In This Life, Lost Without You, Born To Try, Physical
Why Don't We  — I Don't Belong in This Club

In Memoriam
The In Memoriam segment was introduced by Tracy Grimshaw paying tribute to Mike Willesee. A clip of Geoff Harvey playing the piano was played. The following deceased were honoured:

 Jimmy Hannan, singer and entertainer
 Penny Cook, actress
 Mike Williamson, broadcaster
 Judy McBurney, actress
 Michael Audcent, executive
 Valerie Nelson, stylist
 Shane Senior, executive
 Carol Burke, presenter
 Jim Murphy, presenter
 Ian Johnson, executive
 Jackie Martin, supervising post producer
 Andrew Prowse, director
 Paula Zorgdrager, editor
 Sam Chisholm, executive
 Ron Casey, broadcaster
 Carmen Duncan, actress
 Quentin Kenihan, writer, producer
 Trish Ramsay, executive
 Terry McDermott, actor
 Peter Ross, presenter
 Eleanor Witcombe, writer
 Damian Hill, actor
 Paul Blackwell, actor
 Mick Turski, camera
 Melissa Attard, graphics supervisor
 Chris Eichler, audio
 Darius Perkins, actor
 John Bluthal, actor
 Ian Jones, writer, director
 John Proper, producer
 Harry M. Miller, producer, talent manager
 Ross Crabtree, camera
 Jerry Thomas, actor
 Josh Murphy, news reporter
 Rod Myers, staging
 Roland Sampson, camera
 Tony Featherstone, announcer
 David Johnson, broadcast operators
 Bryan Marshall, actor
 Barry Spicer, newsreader
 Billy J. Smith, broadcaster
 Annalise Braakensiek, actress
 Bill Collins, presenter
 Geoff Harvey, musical director

References

External links

2019
2019 television awards
2019 in Australian television
2010s in Queensland
Broadbeach, Queensland
2019 awards in Australia
June 2019 events in Australia